Lawrence S. Ting Memorial Fund  is a not-for-profit charitable organization in Vietnam focusing on education and healthcare.

The fund was licensed in November 2005; operation began in March 2006.

Scholarships 

Lawrence S. Ting Memorial Fund grants scholarships to Vietnamese high school and university students both directly and indirectly through Study Encouragement Funds of Provincial Authorities. 
In the first 5 years of operation, the fund has awarded 2446 scholarships that totaled VND 14 billion; and through Study Encouragement Funds of various provincial authorities 29161 scholarships which totaled VND 19.4 billion.

Moving Forward with IT 

program designed to lessen the digital divide of Vietnamese students. Phase I and Phase II of this program has installed and donated 122 computer labs with 2707 computers at 89 schools (mainly high schools) in 63 provinces in Vietnam. This program enable schools that often do not have any computers available for students to be properly equipped to teach basic computing.  An estimated over 200,000 Vietnamese students benefit from this program and now able to strengthen their computing skills. Phase III is designed to improve the education software and teaching aids available to Vietnamese high school students.  This is a joint effort with the Ministry of Education & Training of Vietnam. An annual contest, "Design of E-learning teaching material", is held to seek the best available Vietnamese education software and teaching aids. Phase III seeks to create a positive environment for the further development education free-wares.

The first competition for Phase III began in December 2009. Results were announced in February 2011. The entries were prepared and submitted by the teachers of university, colleges, junior high school, senior high school and primary-school from nearly 60 provinces and cities nationwide.  885 entries qualified for the final screening. Computer aided teaching materials covered a diverse group of subject matters including, mathematics, physics, chemistry, biology, informatics technology, literature, history, geography, English, civics, music and arts. 81 entries were awarded prizes including first, second, third prize and encouragement prizes.

Funding for Phases I to III totaled approximately VND 45 billion from 2006 to 2010.

Wheelchair donations 

Due to long years of conflict and warfare there are many handicapped people in Vietnam who are economically challenged. Lawrence S. Ting Memorial Fund has donated over 6880 sets of wheelchairs to people living in various Southern and Middle provinces such as Tiền Giang, Phú Thọ, Bến Tre, Bạc Liêu, Cà Mau, Sóc Trăng, Kiên Giang, An Giang, and Hậu Giang.

Public health assistance  

Lawrence S. Ting Memorial Fund has set up a medical station in Mỏ Cày Bắc District, Bến Tre Province at a cost of VND 3.5 billion in 2010. This is the best medical facility for the approximately 50,000 people in the vicinity.
The fund has donated medical equipment and medicines to Red Cross Vietnam, Quảng Ninh Province, and to Thới Bình District, Cà Mau Province.

Other efforts 

Lawrence S. Ting Memorial Fund is engaged is a host of other activities related to education and public health in Vietnam.  Other efforts include select upgrades of school facilities to house IT labs and donations to other Vietnamese social organizations in the fields of education and public health.

Awards 

Lawrence Ting Memorial Fund has won the following commendations and awards for its contributions:

 September 2006. Association for the Support of the Handicapped and Orphans of Vietnam Certificate of Merit 
 March 2007. People's Committee of Ho Chi Minh City Certificate of Merit.
 March 2007. Ministry of Education and Training Certificate of Merit. 
 March 2007. Ministry of Education and Training Commemoration Medal. Awarded jointly by the President of Vietnam and the Minister of Education.
 June 2007. National Committee for Population, Families and Children Commemoration Medal.
 November 2007: People's Committee of Bà Rịa–Vũng Tàu Province Certificate of Merit.
  July 2008. People Committee of Cà Mau Province Certificate of Merit.
 September 2008. People's Committee of Ho Chi Minh City Certificate of Merit.
 January 2009.  People's Committee of Bến Tre Province Certificate of Merit.
 March 2009. People's Committee of Tiền Giang Province Certificate of Merit.
 June 2009. People's Committee of Ho Chi Minh City Certificate of Merit.
 September 2010. Prime Minister Certificate of Merit.
 September 2010. Hanoi People's Committee Certificate of Merit.
 February 2011. Minister of Education & Training Certificate of Merit.

References

Non-profit organizations based in Vietnam